Pattipola Railway Tunnel, or the Summit Tunnel, is the third longest and the highest railway tunnel in Sri Lanka.

The tunnel was designed by Sir Guilford Lindsey Molesworth, the first director-general of Railways in Ceylon (1865–1871), and constructed by F. W. Faviell.

In January 1951 the concrete lining of the tunnel collapsed due to the activities of the Garret engines that were running on the Main Line at that time. Permanent repairs were completed in March 1951 by the district engineer, Priyal de Silva. In 1981 the tunnel was renovated, with the removal of the concrete arches installed in 1951.

References

Further reading
 

Railway tunnels in Sri Lanka
Tunnels completed in 1894
Rail transport in Nuwara Eliya District
Rail transport in Badulla District